Ahmet Nejdet Sançar (May 1, 1910 – February 22, 1975) was a Turkish literature teacher, who became one of the prominent personalities of the Pan-Turkist ideology. He was the younger brother of another notable Turkish nationalist, Nihâl Atsız.

Politics 
The two brothers had strong similarities in many ways. They were both literature teachers and they were defending the same political ideology. Just like his brother, he was tried during the Türkçülük Davası (Trial of Pan-Turkism). The trial was a state reaction to the growing power of the nationalist front in the country because the nationalists were against the policies of the second president of Turkey, İsmet İnönü. In the end, Sançar wasn't found guilty and he was acquitted. He kept his extreme right-wing ideas until his death.

Literature 
Sançar's numerous articles were published in nationalist magazines. Also, he wrote five books which are Türklük Sevgisi (Love of the Turkic Identity), Irkımızın Kahramanları (Heroes of Our Race), Tarihte Türk-İtalyan Savaşları (Italo-Turkish Wars in History), Afşın'a Mektuplar (Letters to Afşın) and İsmet İnönü İle Hesaplaşma (Face to Face with İsmet İnönü).

Death 
Nejdet Sançar died on February 22, 1975, while he was working on an expanded version of his book Tarihte Türk-İtalyan Savaşları (Turkish-Italian Wars in History). Not even a year later, his brother died because of a heart attack. The deaths of the brothers caused a gap in the Pan-Turkist front.

Trivia 
His only son, 15 years old Afşın, died in 1960. When Sançar heard the news, he had a serious stroke which he could only recover from partially.
Sançar took an active role in associations like Türkiye Komünizmle Mücadele Derneği (Turkish Association of Fight with Communism) and Turkish Hearths (Turkish:Türk Ocakları).
The surnames of Nihâl Atsız, Nejdet Sançar and their father are different because during the announcement of the Law on Family Names, they couldn't communicate because of Sançar's military service.

External links 
Sançar's biography from Ministry of Culture and Tourism
Nejdet Sançar's final speech during the Trial of Pan-Turkism 

1975 deaths
1910 births
Turkish nationalists
Turkish writers
Pan-Turkists
Turanists